William Kininmonth may refer to:

 William Kininmonth (architect) (1904–1988), Scottish architect
 William Kininmonth (meteorologist), retired Australian meteorologist